Arthur Wachtel (September 24, 1904 – June 26, 1997) was an American lawyer and politician from New York.

Life
He was born on September 24, 1904, in New York City. He graduated LL.B. from Columbia Law School in 1928. On June 26, 1932, he married Elizabeth (born c. 1910), and they had one son: Daniel Leonard Wachtel (born c. 1937).

Wachtel was a member of the New York State Assembly from 1939 to 1945, sitting in the 162nd, 163rd, 164th and 165th New York State Legislatures. In 1945, he resigned his seat to run for the State Senate seat vacated by the death of Carl Pack.

Wachtel was a member of the New York State Senate from 1946 to 1954, sitting in the 165th, 166th, 167th, 168th and 169th New York State Legislatures. In 1954, he resigned his seat and was appointed to the Municipal Court (Bronx, 1st D.). In November 1954, he was elected to succeed himself and, in 1964, was re-elected. He retired from the Civil Court bench at the end of 1974.

He died on June 26, 1997; and was buried at the Riverside Cemetery in Saddle Brook, New Jersey.

Sources

External links
 

1904 births
1997 deaths
Democratic Party New York (state) state senators
Columbia Law School alumni
New York (state) state court judges
20th-century American lawyers
20th-century American judges
Politicians from the Bronx
20th-century American politicians